Thomas Dooley (born May 12, 1961) is an American former soccer player and coach. He played as a defender and defensive midfielder and was a long-time member and former captain of the United States national team. Dooley recently served as the head coach of the Philippines national team.

Early life
Dooley was born to a German mother and a U.S. Army father.

Club career
Dooley played as a forward with amateur team FK Pirmasens. He started his professional career in 1984 with third division club FC Homburg. He moved to midfield with Homburg and helped the team move steadily up the German leagues, until they finally reached the Bundesliga.

He moved to 1. FC Kaiserslautern in 1988 and helped them to the German Cup in 1990 and the Bundesliga title in 1991. He also played as they won the 1991 DFB-Supercup. After the 1994 World Cup, he moved to Bayer Leverkusen, and to Schalke 04 a year after that, helping them to the 1997 UEFA Cup title.

At the end of the season, he moved to Major League Soccer (MLS), signing with the Columbus Crew. Dooley spent three seasons in Columbus, and was named to the MLS Best XI in both 1997 and 1998.
In 2000, Thomas was traded to the MetroStars for Mike Duhaney, partially to help support Lothar Matthäus' adjustment to the United States. Dooley played one year for the Metros before retiring from playing soccer.

International career
As US Soccer started to look abroad for players eligible to play for its national team in advance of its hosting the 1994 FIFA World Cup, Dooley was discovered.  He made his first international appearance on May 30 against Ireland. Dooley became a regular for the US almost immediately, being named U.S. Soccer Athlete of the Year in 1993 and then playing every minute at the 1994 World Cup, including the match against Colombia which the U.S. won 2–1. After John Harkes was dismissed from the U.S. national team, Dooley was named captain for the 1998 World Cup, and started every game for the U.S.

On February 21, 1999, Dooley was given a send-off match by the United States in a friendly against Chile. He ended his international career with 81 caps and seven goals.

International goals
Scores and results list United States' goal tally first, score column indicates score after each Dooley goal.

Coaching career

Saarbrücken
After retiring, Dooley went back to Germany and became the head coach of FC Saarbrücken in 2002, becoming the first American to coach a team in Europe.

United States
Dooley was appointed by US national team coach Jürgen Klinsmann to be an assistant coach in the match against Mexico on August 10, 2011.

Philippines

In February 2014, Dooley signed a one-year deal with the Philippine Football Federation to handle the Philippines national team.
His first match was a friendly against Malaysia which ended 0–0, and a few days later, narrowly lost to European side Azerbaijan 1–0. Dooley earned his first win for the Philippines after his charges defeated Nepal 3–0 in another friendly match in Qatar.

Dooley earned national team manager Dan Palami's praise after his first few matches in charge. Palami commended Dooley's ability to foster a better understanding of the game to his squad and give subs and reserves chances to step up in the absence of star players."Our players have a better understanding of the role they have to play in their respective positions under Dooley's system that anyone can step up even if we don't have our stars playing," Palami said.

The Philippine national team came close to qualifying to the 2015 AFC Asian Cup. They failed to qualify after they lost 0–1 to Palestine in the final of the 2014 AFC Challenge Cup. Two months after the tournament, Stephan Schröck and Dennis Cagara resigned from the national team over tensions with Dooley. Schröck had disagreement with the setup of the national team under Dooley but has made amends with the coach in 2015 and briefly played once again for the Philippines though undisclosed issues surfaced in 2016.

In his first match coaching the Philippines in a World Cup qualifier, Dooley's team defeated Bahrain 2–1. After an impressive run in qualifying that included a 3–2 win over North Korea that was considered an upset, Dooley's contract was extended for two years.

Dooley failed to get the Philippines past the group stage at the 2016 AFF Championship, which the Philippines co-hosted with Myanmar. He managed to secure qualification for the Philippines for their first Asian Cup stint in the 2019 by winning 2–1 over Tajikistan in March 2018. The coach's contract with the Philippines ended on March 31, 2018 after the historic match. Dooley's contract was not renewed and the PFF announced Terry Butcher as his successor in June 2018.

Viettel
In 2019, Dooley was appointed as sporting director of V.League 1 club Viettel. During his tenure, Viettel won the 2020 V.League 1 title.

Sri Pahang
In January 2021, Dooley was appointed as head coach of Malaysia Super League club Sri Pahang, replacing Dollah Salleh. Three months after his appointment, Dooley was sacked by Sri Pahang together with his assistant coach, Christophe Gamel and was replaced by former head coach Dollah Salleh. After being sacked, he was immediately appointed as adviser of Sri Pahang U21 team while Gamel was appointed as head coach.

Return to Philippines
In May 2022, Dooley was reappointed as head coach of the Philippines national team ahead of the third round of 2023 AFC Asian Cup qualifiers, replacing Scott Cooper. He signed a short-term deal with an option to extend depending on the qualification of the Philippines to the 2023 AFC Asian Cup.

Managerial statistics

References

Living people
1961 births
People from Südwestpfalz
Citizens of the United States through descent
American soccer coaches
American soccer players
United States men's international soccer players
German footballers
American people of German descent
German people of American descent
FK Pirmasens players
FC 08 Homburg players
1. FC Kaiserslautern players
Bayer 04 Leverkusen players
FC Schalke 04 players
Columbus Crew players
New York Red Bulls players
2. Bundesliga players
Bundesliga players
Major League Soccer players
Major League Soccer All-Stars
German emigrants to the United States
Footballers from Rhineland-Palatinate
1993 CONCACAF Gold Cup players
1994 FIFA World Cup players
1995 Copa América players
1996 CONCACAF Gold Cup players
1998 CONCACAF Gold Cup players
1998 FIFA World Cup players
1. FC Saarbrücken managers
Philippines national football team managers
Association football defenders
American expatriate soccer coaches
UEFA Cup winning players
National Soccer Hall of Fame members
West German footballers
German expatriate sportspeople in the Philippines
American expatriate sportspeople in the Philippines
German expatriate football managers
Expatriate football managers in the Philippines
Expatriate football managers in Malaysia
German expatriate sportspeople in Malaysia
American expatriate sportspeople in Malaysia